Anievas is a municipality located in the autonomous community of Cantabria, Spain. According to the 2007 census, the city has a population of 12.919 inhabitants. Its capital is Cotillo.

Towns
Barriopalacio
Cotillo (Capital)
Calga
Villasuso

References

External links

Municipalities in Cantabria